The U.S. Post Office and Courthouse, built in 1933, is an historic United States Post Office and federal courthouse building located  at 120 12th Street in  Columbus, Georgia. It was designed   by Atlanta-based architect William Augustus Edwards who designed nine South Carolina courthouses as well as academic buildings at 12 institutions in Florida, Georgia and South Carolina. On September 29, 1980, it was added to the National Register of Historic Places.

See also 
National Register of Historic Places listings in Muscogee County, Georgia
U.S. Post Office and Courthouse (disambiguation)
List of United States post offices

References

External links 
 National Register listings for Muscogee County
 University of Florida biography of William Augustus Edwards
 

Post office buildings in Georgia (U.S. state)
Federal courthouses in the United States
Courthouses in Georgia (U.S. state)
William Augustus Edwards buildings
Buildings and structures in Columbus, Georgia
Government buildings completed in 1933
Courthouses on the National Register of Historic Places in Georgia (U.S. state)
Post office buildings on the National Register of Historic Places in Georgia (U.S. state)
National Register of Historic Places in Muscogee County, Georgia
1933 establishments in Georgia (U.S. state)